Jorge Fernando Barroso Maciel (born 12 November 1986 in Vila Cova, Barcelos), known as Campinho, is a Portuguese professional footballer who plays as a central defender.

External links

1986 births
Living people
People from Barcelos, Portugal
Portuguese footballers
Association football defenders
Liga Portugal 2 players
Segunda Divisão players
Varzim S.C. players
G.D. Ribeirão players
Académico de Viseu F.C. players
Boavista F.C. players
Sportspeople from Braga District